Amanda "Binky" Urban is an American literary agent and partner at ICM Partners.

Urban started at ICM as a literary agent, worked as Co-Director of the ICM Literary Department in New York, and had been Managing Director of ICM Books in London from 2002 to 2008. Before ICM, she was General Manager of New York Magazine and The Village Voice, and Editorial Manager of Esquire Magazine.

In December 2010, the Center for Fiction awarded Amanda Urban the Maxwell E. Perkins Award in recognition of her work and contribution to the field of fiction writing. She was the first book agent selected to receive the award.

Urban attended Kent Place School and graduated from Wheaton College in Massachusetts as an English major in 1968.

She has represented dozens of authors, among them Jennifer Egan, Bret Easton Ellis, and Nora Ephron.

References

External links 
 Amanda Urban at Curtis Brown (agency)

Literary agents
Living people
1946 births
20th-century American businesspeople
Kent Place School alumni
Wheaton College (Massachusetts) alumni